The canton of Brignoles is an administrative division of the Var department, southeastern France. Its borders were modified at the French canton reorganisation which came into effect in March 2015. Its seat is in Brignoles.

It consists of the following communes:

Brignoles
Carcès
La Celle
Correns
Cotignac
Entrecasteaux
Montfort-sur-Argens
Rougiers
Saint-Antonin-du-Var
Tourves
Le Val
Vins-sur-Caramy

References

Cantons of Var (department)